Phil Bailey (born 25 May 1980) is an Australian rugby league footballer who plays for the New York Knights in the USA Rugby League. A former New South Wales and Australian representative player.

Playing career
Bailey made his first grade debut for Manly Warringah in Round 5 1999 against South Sydney.  At the end of 1999, Manly merged with arch rivals North Sydney to form the now defunct Northern Eagles side.  Bailey played for the Northern Eagles in 2001 before joining Cronulla-Sutherland in 2002.  Bailey made 19 appearances for Cronulla in his first season at the club as they reached the preliminary final against New Zealand but were defeated 16-10.

Bailey was signed to the Wigan Warriors in the Super League for the 2007, 2008, 2009 and 2010 seasons. He made his Wigan Warriors, Super League début in a 10–16 defeat by Warrington Wolves at the JJB Stadium on 9 February 2007.

Career highlights 
Junior Club: Inverell Hawks

Representative games 
State Of Origin: Played 3 games in total for New South Wales
International: Played 4 tests to date for Australia

References

External links 
Phil Bailey Official Player Profile
State of Origin Official website Rugby League Player Stats
 Official Wigan Warriors First Team
 Phil Bailey Wigan Career Page on the Wigan RL Fansite.

1980 births
Living people
Australia national rugby league team players
Australian expatriate sportspeople in England
Australian rugby league coaches
Australian rugby league players
Australian rugby union coaches
Australian rugby union players
Cronulla-Sutherland Sharks players
Manly Warringah Sea Eagles players
New South Wales Rugby League State of Origin players
New York Knights players
Northern Eagles players
Rugby league centres
Rugby league locks
Rugby league players from Inverell, New South Wales
Rugby league second-rows
Wigan Warriors players